Urelapa Island (also Île Oulilapa, Île Ulilapa) is a private uninhabited island in Sanma Province of Vanuatu in the Pacific Ocean.

References

Islands of Vanuatu
Sanma Province